Buried Treasures is a 1967 live album by Dave Brubeck and his quartet, recorded during their tour of Mexico. It was released in 1998. A second live album recorded on their tour, Bravo! Brubeck!, was released in July 1967.

Reception

The album was reviewed by Scott Yanow at Allmusic who wrote that "The quality is certainly quite high, with Brubeck and Desmond really digging into such songs as "Koto Song" (coming up with some inspired ideas over its vamp), "You Go to My Head," a lengthy "St. Louis Blues," and a fairly concise version of "Take Five," one of the few versions by Brubeck of the hit song that does not have a drum solo. ...the Quartet is heard throughout in prime form. Recommended".

Doug Ramsey reviewed the album for Jazz Times and wrote that "It catches the quartet in as fine fettle...The empathy, the tightness, the ability to anticipate that this band had developed in nearly a decade together was at its peak. "Mr. Broadway," at a furious clip, is pure exhiliration. The listener has to wonder at Wright's and Morello's cohesiveness, let alone their continued swing, under Brubeck's fragmentation of meter in his solo. There is a "Koto Song" with Desmond again proving himself a blues master and Brubeck as delicate as a French impressionist. ...This was an impressive group. Seven months later, Brubeck disbanded it".

Track listing
 Introduction – 1:30
 "Mr. Broadway" (Dave Brubeck) – 7:18
 "Koto Song" (Brubeck) – 7:21
 "Sweet Georgia Brown" (Ben Bernie, Kenneth Casey, Maceo Pinkard) – 7:38
 "Forty Days" (Brubeck) – 7:22
 "You Go to My Head" (J. Fred Coots, Haven Gillespie) – 7:31
 "Take Five" (Paul Desmond) – 5:10
 "Saint Louis Blues" (W. C. Handy) – 11:19

Personnel
Performance
Dave Brubeck - piano, arranger, liner notes
Paul Desmond - alto saxophone
Gene Wright - double bass
Joe Morello - drums
Production
Steven Berkowitz, Patti Matheny - a&r
Howard Fitzson — art direction, photography
Randall Martin — design, reissue design
Seth Rothstein — director
Nicholas Bennett — packaging manager
Hank Parker — photography
Didier C. Deutsch, Russell Gloyd — reissue producer
John Jackson — production assistant
Howard Fritzson — reissue art
Darcy Proper — remastering, remixing

References

1967 live albums
Columbia Records live albums
Dave Brubeck live albums
Live instrumental albums
1967 in Mexico